Laptevo is a rural locality (a selo) in Vtorovskoye Rural Settlement, Kameshkovsky District, Vladimir Oblast, Russia. The population was 101 as of 2010. There is one street.

Geography 
Laptevo is located 21 km southwest of Kameshkovo (the district's administrative centre) by road. Bliznino is the nearest rural locality.

References 

Rural localities in Kameshkovsky District
Vladimirsky Uyezd